SS Samfinn was a Liberty ship built in the United States during World War II. She was transferred to the British Ministry of War Transportation (MoWT) upon completion.

Construction
Samfinn was laid down on 14 February 1944, under a Maritime Commission (MARCOM) contract, MC hull 2352, by J.A. Jones Construction, Brunswick, Georgia; sponsored by Miss Betty Dean, and launched on 31 March 1944.

History
She was allocated to Donaldson Bros. & Black, on 13 April 1944. On 16 September 1947, she was laid up in the National Defense Reserve Fleet, in Mobile, Alabama. She was sold to Union Minerals and Alloys Corporation, 18 April 1961, for $62,339.89, for scrapping. She was removed from the fleet on 12 June 1961.

References

Bibliography

 
 
 
 
 

 

Liberty ships
Ships built in Brunswick, Georgia
1944 ships
Mobile Reserve Fleet
Liberty ships transferred to the British Ministry of War Transport